Huilong is a town of Wei County of Handan City in extreme southern Hebei province, China, bordering Henan to the south and situated  southwest of the county seat and  east of Anyang, Henan. , it has 29 villages under its administration.

See also
List of township-level divisions of Hebei

References

Township-level divisions of Hebei